William Horace Taylor (7 December 1889 – 20 June 1986) was a Canadian politician.

Born in Townsend Township, Ontario, he grew up on a farm near Scotland, Ontario, south of Brantford, Ontario. From 1921 to 1925, he was a farmer in Scotland. He was elected a councillor and later the reeve of Windham Township.

In 1926, he was elected to the House of Commons of Canada in the riding of Norfolk—Elgin. A Liberal, he was re-elected in 1930, 1935, and 1940. From 1940 to 1945, he was the Chief Government Whip.

In 1945, he was summoned to the Senate of Canada representing the senatorial division of Norfolk, Ontario. He retired in 1966.

References

External links
 

1889 births
1986 deaths
Canadian senators from Ontario
Liberal Party of Canada MPs
Members of the House of Commons of Canada from Ontario
People from Norfolk County, Ontario